Ise Ekiti (also Ise) is a city in Ekiti State, Nigeria, It is the traditional home of Akinluaduse, also known as Akinluse by the inhabitants of the city. Akinluse was a great warrior in the ancient Oyo empire. Ise - Ekiti is the headquarters of  the Ise/Orun Local Government Area, along with Orun.
Ise ekiti is divided into three quarters namely; Oraye, Odo Ise and Erinwa. The Arinjale of Ise-Ekiti is Oba Ayodele Ajayi Aweloye II. .

As of 2007 Ise local government had an estimated population of 204,022.

References

External links
Website of Ekiti State

Populated places in Ekiti State
Towns in Yorubaland